Manuel Schmiedebach (born 5 December 1988) is a German professional footballer. He plays as a midfielder.

Career
Born in West Berlin, Schmiedebach was first a product of hometown club Hertha BSC's youth teams.

In 2008 he joined the amateur team of Hannover 96 II in the Regionalliga Nord on a free transfer. The next season, he debuted under manager Dieter Hecking on 8 August 2009 against his former club form Hertha BSC in the Bundesliga. In a difficult season due to the suicide of the team's goalkeeper and captain Robert Enke he managed to become one of the most important players in Hannover's midfield. In May 2010 he decided to extend his contract with Hannover 96 up to 2012.

Personal life
Schmiedebach grew up bilingual, speaking German and Spanish. His mother Betty is a Colombian-born Venezuelan of Moroccan descent, she came to Berlin over two decades ago. His father Helmuth has Irish roots.

Career statistics

References

External links
 
 

1988 births
Living people
German footballers
Germany youth international footballers
Footballers from Berlin
German people of Colombian descent
German people of Moroccan descent
German people of Venezuelan descent
German people of Irish descent
Association football midfielders
Hertha BSC II players
Hannover 96 II players
Hannover 96 players
1. FC Union Berlin players
Bundesliga players
2. Bundesliga players
Regionalliga players
SC Staaken players